Lauro Díaz Castro (16 December 1941 – 25 July 2003) was a Mexican politician affiliated with the Institutional Revolutionary Party. He served as Senator of the LVIII Legislature of the Mexican Congress  representing Sinaloa. He also served as municipal president of Culiacán from 1990 to 1992.

References

1941 births
2003 deaths
Politicians from Sinaloa
People from Guamúchil
Municipal presidents in Sinaloa
Members of the Senate of the Republic (Mexico)
Institutional Revolutionary Party politicians
Monterrey Institute of Technology and Higher Education alumni
Deaths from cancer in Mexico
21st-century Mexican politicians